Fernando Climent Huerta (born 27 May 1958 in Coria del Río, Sevilla) is a retired competition rower and Olympic champion from Spain.

He won a silver medal in the coxless pair event at the 1984 Summer Olympics in Los Angeles, together with Luis María Lasúrtegui. He is now the President of the Spanish Rowing Federation.

References

External links
Spanish Olympic Committee

1958 births
Living people
People from Coria del Río
Sportspeople from the Province of Seville
Spanish male rowers
Olympic rowers of Spain
Olympic silver medalists for Spain
Rowers at the 1984 Summer Olympics
Rowers at the 1988 Summer Olympics
Rowers at the 1992 Summer Olympics
Rowers at the 1996 Summer Olympics
Olympic medalists in rowing
Medalists at the 1984 Summer Olympics
World Rowing Championships medalists for Spain
20th-century Spanish people